Dana DeArmond (born June 16, 1979) is an American pornographic actress and director. She entered the industry in 2004 and is a member of the AVN and XRCO Halls of Fame.

Career

DeArmond grew up in Orlando, Florida. DeArmond had gained popularity before her porn career, as an internet personality with over 300,000 friends on Myspace. After meeting porn director Eon McKai on MySpace, she did her first scene for the film Neu Wave Hookers. DeArmond is currently the host of a show titled Dirty/Nerdy on Vivid Radio for Sirius XM.

DeArmond has directed two documentary porn movies in which she helps young people whom she meets on the web break into the business, called Dana DeArmond Does the Internet and Dana DeArmond's Role Modeling. She has also guest lectured on the adult industry for classes at University of California, Irvine and University of California, Santa Barbara.

Appearances
DeArmond was one of the models featured in Michael Grecco's photo book, Naked Ambition: An R Rated Look at an X Rated Industry and Dave Naz's book L.A. Bondage. After DeArmond's house and belongings were destroyed in a fire in January 2007, the adult industry participated in several fundraising activities to help replace what she lost. DeArmond co-hosted the 2010 Urban X Awards with porn actress Misty Stone.

In November 2007, DeArmond and her then-boyfriend, male performer Daniel, attended UC-Irvine as guest lecturers for its Sociology of Sexuality class. She got the job through fellow performer Belladonna who lectured there previously. Following a lecture from Kassia Wosick-Correa, DeArmond spoke about her involvement in the adult film industry and the dynamics of her relationships. She also screened video clips and answered questions from the class.

In January 2014, DeArmond, Asa Akira, Chanel Preston, and Jessie Andrews were featured in a Cosmopolitan article titled "4 Porn Stars on How They Stay Fit". The article was inspired by actress Gabrielle Union's comment made on Conan O'Brien's talk show about striving to follow the fitness routines of the porn stars she saw at her gym.

In 2021, she was cast in the drama film Pleasure.

Personal life
DeArmond admits to having social anxiety, stating, "I made my life so I don’t have to come into contact with lots of people except for once or twice a year when I sign." She dealt with her social anxiety by spending a lot of time on MySpace and an "Indie Rock" chat room on AOL. Her hobbies include working out, hiking and biking. Her favorite male performers include James Deen, Mr. Pete, Toni Ribas, and Manuel Ferrara. DeArmond identifies as a feminist.

In 2017, DeArmond accused T.J. Miller and Jordan Vogt-Roberts of sexual harassment on the set of Mash Up. She also alleged that Vogt-Roberts kissed her without her consent after having drinks with him after they wrapped work.

Awards

References

External links

 
 
 
 

1979 births
American female adult models
American female erotic dancers
American erotic dancers
American feminists
American pornographic film actresses
Bondage models
Living people
Pornographic film actors from North Carolina
Women pornographic film directors
People from Fort Bragg, North Carolina
Sex-positive feminists
21st-century American women